Sainte-Lucie-de-Beauregard is a municipality in Quebec.

See also
L'Islet Regional County Municipality
Big Black River (Saint John River), a river
List of municipalities in Quebec

References

Municipalities in Quebec
Incorporated places in Chaudière-Appalaches